Cathedral High School is a Catholic secondary school located in Hamilton. It is a part of the Hamilton-Wentworth Catholic District School Board and is affiliated with the nearby cathedral Christ the King.

Student clubs 
Student Council, CHSTV News, Eco Team, Year End video Crew, Glee, Choir, Band, SWAT, Health Action Team, Yo Go Girl, Best Buddies, Board Game Club, Cathedral Works, Breakfast Club, Gael Guides, Culture of Life, Art Club, Stage Crew, Gael Gazette, Diversity Ambassadors as well as Gael Pride.

In 2016, the girls rugby team won the city championships, defeating St. Jean de Brébeuf Catholic Secondary School.

Notable alumni 
 Mike Cornell – CFL player, currently active on the Winnipeg Blue Bombers
 Pete Giftopoulos – CFL player
 Nathan Kanya – CFL player, currently active on the Saskatchewan Roughriders
 Bobbi Lancaster – medical doctor and professional golfer
 Brian Melo – winner of the fifth season of Canadian Idol
 Patrick Pugliese – former member of the Canada Men's National Water Polo Team, participated in the 1972 Summer Olympics and the 1976 Summer Olympics
 Pat Quinn – former player and head coach in the NHL, most recently with the Edmonton Oilers
 Paul Francis Reding – former Bishop of the Roman Catholic Diocese of Hamilton, Ontario and patron of Bishop Reding Catholic Secondary School in Milton, Ontario
 Rocco Romano – former CFL player, inducted into the Canadian Football Hall of Fame in 2007
 Dave Stala – CFL player, currently active on the Toronto Argonauts
 Tomi Swick – critically acclaimed musician and Juno Award winner
 Melissa Tancredi – soccer player for the Canada women's national soccer team, winning bronze medal at the 2012 Summer Olympics
 Tyrone Watson – basketball player

Notable faculty 
 Thomas Christopher Collins – Archbishop of Toronto

See also 
 List of secondary schools in Ontario

References

External links 
 
 
 
 

High schools in Hamilton, Ontario
Catholic secondary schools in Ontario
Educational institutions established in 1912
1912 establishments in Ontario
Roman Catholic schools in Ontario